Bradford County Courthouse is a historic courthouse building located at Towanda, Bradford County, Pennsylvania. It was built between 1896 and 1898, and is a four-story, cruciform shaped building, with Classical Revival and Renaissance Revival-style design influences. It has rusticated sandstone exterior walls and a 50-foot diameter octagonal dome atop the roof. It features an entrance portico supported by Tuscan order columns. Also on the property is a modest two-story brick annex building that was built in 1847-1848.  Also on the property is a large soldiers' monument, erected about 1905.

It was added to the National Register of Historic Places in 1987.

Gallery

See also
 List of state and county courthouses in Pennsylvania

References

External links
Bradford County, Pennsylvania website

County courthouses in Pennsylvania
Courthouses on the National Register of Historic Places in Pennsylvania
Renaissance Revival architecture in Pennsylvania
Neoclassical architecture in Pennsylvania
Government buildings completed in 1848
Government buildings completed in 1898
Buildings and structures in Bradford County, Pennsylvania
National Register of Historic Places in Bradford County, Pennsylvania
1898 establishments in Pennsylvania